Nasi ulam is a traditional Indonesian dish of steamed rice (nasi) served with various herbs and vegetables (ulam)

The herbs being used  especially the leaves of pegagan (Centella asiatica) or often replaced with kemangi (lemon basil), vegetables, spices and accompanied with various side dishes. This dish is a feature of Betawi and Malay cuisine with many variations and is commonly found in Indonesia, Malaysia, Singapore and southern Thailand. Nasi ulam is often served with sambal chilli paste.

History 
Nasi ulam is a typical Betawi mixed rice. Nasi ulam is a cross of several culinary cultures that influence the variant of the nasi ulam and its side dishes. Some say that white rice topped with coconut serundeng (ulam) and peanuts is an Indian influence. In Indonesia, Nasi Ulam is not only found in Jakarta, but also in Sumatra and Bali. Ulam in Betawi language is the name for serundeng from grated coconut, which when stirred with hot white rice will bring out a savory and slightly spicy taste on the tongue. 

The history of Nasi Ulam actually comes from Tangerang, banten, although it comes from Tangerang, this dish is rarely known by the surrounding community and is more associated with cuisine from Jakarta, this is because in the past many Nasi Ulam traders from Tangerang traded Nasi ulam to the Glodok, Jakarta, and there they introduced their cuisine to the local community, especially to Chinese Indonesians.

Not all Betawi people in Jakarta are familiar with all variations of Nasi Ulam, both wet (basah) and dry (kering). Wet ulam is only known among the Cina Benteng, Petak Sembilan, kawasan Pecinan, Tanjung Priok, Kemayoran, Matraman, dan Senen. Meanwhile, dried ulam is known in the Tebet, Kayumanis, and Mester Jatinegara areas. Betawi people usually eat rice ulam in the morning as one of the breakfast menus.

Variants

Indonesia
In Indonesia, nasi ulam can be found in Betawi (native Jakartans) cuisine as well as Bali and Sumatran Malay.

In Jakarta there are two types of nasi ulam, the wet (soupy) nasi ulam of northern and central Jakarta, and dry one of southern Jakarta. In Indonesia, nasi ulam usually spiced with kemangi herb, chili, sliced cucumber and sprinkled with peanuts granule and serundeng (grated and sauteed coconut). An array of other additional dishes are often added on top of nasi ulam, such as dendeng (beef jerky), telur dadar (omelette), perkedel (mashed potato fritter), fried tofu or tempeh, and krupuk.

Malaysia
Nasi ulam in Malaysia consist of cold boiled rice that is mixed with shredded herbs such as daun kaduk (wild pepper leaf), pucuk gajus (cashew leaf shoots), onions etc. Kerisik and other spices are also added. Sometimes shredded fried fish is mixed in. This version is common in northwest Peninsular Malaysia. A type of nasi ulam in northeast Peninsular Malaysia, in which the rice is dyed blue, is called nasi kerabu.

See also

Ulam (salad)
Nasi bogana
Nasi campur
Nasi goreng
Nasi kebuli
Nasi kerabu
Nasi kucing
Nasi kuning
Nasi lemak
Nasi liwet
Nasi pecel
Nasi tim
Nasi uduk

References

Indonesian rice dishes
Betawi cuisine
Malay cuisine
Malaysian rice dishes